Matteo Stefanini (born 29 April 1984) is a rower from Italy.

Biography
He competed for his native country at the 2004 Summer Olympics in Athens in the single sculls, and won the gold medal in the men's double sculls event at the 2005 Mediterranean Games alongside Alessio Sartori.  At the 2010 World Championships, he finished second in the men's quadruple sculls.  At the 2012 Summer Olympics, he competed in the quadruple sculls.

References

External links
 

1984 births
Living people
Italian male rowers
Olympic rowers of Italy
Rowers at the 2004 Summer Olympics
Rowers at the 2012 Summer Olympics
Rowers at the 2016 Summer Olympics
Sportspeople from Pisa
World Rowing Championships medalists for Italy
Mediterranean Games gold medalists for Italy
Competitors at the 2005 Mediterranean Games
Mediterranean Games medalists in rowing